Eucalyptus diminuta, commonly known as the spring mallee, is a species of mallee that is endemic to south-west of Western Australia. It has smooth, silvery to greyish bark, sometimes with rough flaky bark near the base, lance-shaped adult leaves, pendulous, elongated flower buds arranged in groups of seven, creamy white flowers and cup-shaped to bell-shaped fruit.

Description
It has smooth silvery to greyish bark, sometimes with a short stocking of rough flaky bark near the base. Flowering occurs between July and November and the flowers are creamy white.

Taxonomy and naming
Eucalyptus diminuta was first formally described by the botanists Ian Brooker and Stephen Hopper in 2002 in the journal Nuytsia. The type specimen was collected by Brooker near Glenfield on the road to Yuna. The specific epithet (diminuta) is a Latin word meaning "diminished", referring to the size of the plants, its buds and fruit compared to the related E. stowardii.

This species is part of the Eucalyptus subgenus Symphyomyrtus in the section Bisectae and the subsection Glandulosae. It is closely related to E. stowardii.

Distribution and habitat
The spring mallee is found on sandplains and near swamps along the west coast in the Mid West and Wheatbelt regions of Western Australia where it grows over laterite in sandy clay or sandy soils.

Conservation status
Eucalyptus diminuta is classified as "not threatened" by the Western Australian Government Department of Parks and Wildlife.

See also
List of Eucalyptus species

References

Eucalypts of Western Australia
diminuta
Myrtales of Australia
Plants described in 2002
Taxa named by Ian Brooker
Taxa named by Stephen Hopper